is a kaiju film monster taking the form of an enormous monstrous lobster. The name Ebirah is a portmanteau of the Japanese word for "shrimp" or "lobster" (蝦, ebi) and the -ra ending often appended to the names of kaiju monsters, such as Mothra, Hedorah, Ghidorah, etc. and Godzilla himself (Jp: Gojira).

Ebirah first appeared in Toho's 1966 film Ebirah, Horror of the Deep. It is one of the two main antagonists of the film. Ebirah has also appeared in All Monsters Attack and Godzilla: Final Wars.

Ebirah has also appeared in a number of video games, including King of the Monsters, Godzilla, Godzilla: Save the Earth, Godzilla Unleashed: Double Smash, and Godzilla Trading Battle.

Overview

Showa series
In Ebirah, Horror of the Deep, a terrorist organization called the Red Bamboo had set up a base of operations on Letchi Island. The giant lobster Ebirah was successfully used to destroy any ship that came too close to the island. The Red Bamboo ships used a special extract from the island’s fruit to protect themselves from Ebirah. When a small group of people stranded on the island saw the monster Godzilla sleeping in a cave, they woke it so it could fight Ebirah. Godzilla easily won and injured the crustacean with its atomic ray. The day after, a Red Bamboo ship appeared, but they unknowingly used a placebo and not the real fruit extract. Ebirah attacked and tore the ship apart. Godzilla reappeared, but this time, Godzilla pulled off Ebirah’s claws. The wounded Ebirah then fled.

Ebirah was not seen again until it appeared on Monster Island in Ichiro’s dreams in All Monsters Attack. Its appearance in this film is simply stock footage utilized from Ebirah, Horror of the Deep. Ebirah was originally going to appear in Destroy All Monsters, but did not make it to the final draft.

Showa Ebirah is 50 meters (164 feet) tall and weighs 23,000 metric tons (25,353 short tons).

Millennium series
In the Millennium era, Ebirah makes an appearance in Godzilla: Final Wars as one of the many controlled monsters of the Xiliens, a race of extraterrestrial beings. It destroys a factory near Tokyo, and the military forces are sent to destroy it, but are outmatched by the immense crustacean. Instead, the mutant soldiers are called to stop the monster. The mutants successfully defeat Ebirah and are about to kill it, when it disappears in a flash of light. The Xiliens arrive and say that they destroyed the monsters to save Earth. However, it is soon found out that the monsters were in fact controlled by the Xiliens all along.

The Gotengo then frees Godzilla from the Antarctic so it can fight the controlled monsters. The plan is a success and Godzilla successfully defeats all of the monsters. When it arrives in Tokyo Bay, it faces Ebirah and the Smog Monster Hedorah. However, they are no match for Godzilla, who blasts them out of the water with its atomic ray and the duo crash into a building, where Ebirah's claw stabs Hedorah's eye. With another blast, Godzilla destroys them both.

Final Wars Ebirah is 30 meters (98 feet) tall, 100 meters (328 feet) long, and weighs 50,000 metric tons (55,115 short tons).

Reiwa series
In Godzilla: Monster Apocalypse, a prequel novel to Godzilla: Planet of the Monsters, two Ebirah appeared in the Atlantic Ocean in early 2010's. USS Saratoga defeated a third Ebirah in the Pacific Ocean.

Appearances

Films
 Ebirah, Horror of the Deep aka Godzilla vs. The Sea Monster (1966)
 All Monsters Attack aka Godzilla's Revenge (1969) stock footage cameo
 Godzilla: Final Wars (2004)

Video games
 Flappy (first appeared on FM-7 in 1983)
 Kaijū-ō Godzilla / King of the Monsters, Godzilla (Game Boy - 1993)
 Godzilla Trading Battle (PlayStation - 1998)
 Godzilla: Save the Earth (Xbox, PS2 - 2004)
 Godzilla Unleashed: Double Smash (NDS - 2007)
 Godzilla Defense Force (2019)

Literature
 Godzilla: The Half-Century War (comic - 2012-2013)
 Godzilla: Rulers of Earth (comic - 2013-2015)
 Godzilla: Cataclysm (comic - 2014)
 Godzilla: Monster Apocalypse'' (novel - 2017)

References

Bibliography
 

Fictional lobsters and crayfish
Godzilla characters
Fictional characters with superhuman strength
Fictional characters who can move at superhuman speeds
Mothra characters
Fictional monsters
Toho monsters
Science fiction film characters
Fantasy film characters
Fictional crustaceans
Fictional sea monsters
Film characters introduced in 1966
Kaiju
Horror film villains